"Really Don't Like U" (stylised in sentence case) is a song by Swedish singer-songwriter Tove Lo featuring Australian singer Kylie Minogue. It was released on 6 September 2019, as the fourth single from Lo's fourth studio album Sunshine Kitty (2019). The song was written by Lo, Caroline Ailin and its producer Ian Kirkpatrick. "Really Don't Like U" is an electropop, ambient pop, synth-pop, disco and electro song, with its lyrics discussing feelings of betrayal and dislike towards the new lover of an ex.

Background and composition
"Really Don't Like U" was written by Lo, Caroline Ailin and its producer Ian Kirkpatrick. Lo explained how the song came to fruition, stating that she met Minogue in Hong Kong at an AmfAR event and expressed interest to collaborate on a track. Lo then pitched the song to Minogue, who decided to feature. "Really Don't Like U" was then announced in August 2019, as part of the track list of her fourth upcoming album, Sunshine Kitty. In a press release for the single, Minogue commented that their collaboration "seemingly came out of nowhere" but was the "perfect moment". Lo also stated:

The track was recorded at Zenseven Studios in Tarzana, California, USA, MXM Studios in Los Angeles, USA and SARM Studios in London, UK.

The song runs for three minutes and 45 seconds. Music critics have described "Really Don't Like U" as a blend of various subgenres of electronic music, including electropop, ambient pop, synth-pop, disco, electro, eurodance, and R&B. The "slinky" production is based on a skittering, minimal electronic beat, while the duo sing together on the chorus: "I know I’ve got no right to / I know I’ve got no right to / Really, I just don’t like you". Lyrically, the song discusses the feelings of seeing an ex with another girl at a party.

Release and artwork
"Really Don't Like U" was released as the fourth single from Lo's upcoming fourth studio album, Sunshine Kitty, by Republic Records on 6 September 2019. The cover art depicts a hand holding glittered handcuffs on a pink silk background, and features a love heart shape containing the singers' logos and various icons.

Critical reception

The song has received critical acclaim from music critics. Mike Wass of Idolator said that "Really Don't Like U" is a "shimmery electro-pop bop", praising the song for discussing "a very relatable theme". Emily Zemler of Rolling Stone described the song as an "ambient pop number". She commented that "the pair's airy vocals meld together over the chorus". An editor from Out called the collaboration "pop excellence", stating that the song "deconstructs girl-on-girl hate while still acknowledging that just because we know a behavior is wrong doesn’t mean we can stop doing it." Shaad D'Souza of The Fader called the song "a typically sly, chaotic track from the Swedish pop musician".

Music video
The lyric video for "Really Don't Like U" was uploaded to Lo's official YouTube channel on 13 September. The video was filmed in London and Prague, and begins with "both women anxiously staying in their apartments to avoid confrontation". Scenes of Lo walking down various streets and Minogue singing the song into a microphone at a bar are later featured, with "karaoke booth-style lyric captions" displayed on screen throughout.

Credits and personnel
Credits adapted from Tidal.

 Tove Lo – vocals, composition, lyrics
 Kylie Minogue – vocals
 Caroline Ailin – composition, lyrics
 Ian Kirkpatrick – production, composition, lyrics, programming
 John Hanes – mixing
 Serban Ghenea – mixing
 Chris Gehringer – mastering

Charts

Release history

References

External links
 

2019 singles
2019 songs
Tove Lo songs
Kylie Minogue songs
Songs written by Tove Lo
Songs written by Caroline Ailin
Songs written by Ian Kirkpatrick (record producer)
Electropop songs
Republic Records singles